Charles William Grant was born in 1782. He was the son of Captain David Alexander Grant and Marie-Charles-Joseph Le Moyne, Baronne de Longueuil. He served during the War of 1812 as Lieutenant Colonel of the Boucherville militia battalion and as a staff officer. He was taken prisoner by the Americans on 8 December 1813, and was held hostage in Worcester, Massachusetts. He married Caroline Coffin, daughter of General John Coffin and Anne Mathews, on 21 May 1814. He became a member of the Legislative Council of Lower Canada. He succeeded to the title of Baron de Longueuil on 17 January 1841. He died on 5 July 1848 at his residence of Alwington House in Kingston.

Ancestry

References

1782 births
1848 deaths
Barons of Longueuil
Le Moyne family